Women and Gold is a 1925 American silent drama film directed by James P. Hogan and starring Frank Mayo, Sylvia Breamer and William B. Davidson. It was produced by the independent Gotham Pictures.

Synopsis
In South America, bored Myra Barclay runs off with Señor Ortego the owner of the mine for which her husband is manager. Soon realizing she has made a mistake she decides to return to her husband but suffers a head injury and suffers amnesia. Meanwhile, her husband is arrested for the attempted murder of Ortego. Breaking free he manages to find his wife, and the sight of him restores her memory. Ortego has been dealt justice by being stabbed to death by another man he has wronged.

Cast
 Frank Mayo as Dan Barclay
 Sylvia Breamer as 	Myra Barclay
 William B. Davidson as Señor Ortego
 Frankie Darro as Dan Barclay Jr. 
 Ina Anson as 	Carmelita
 Tote Du Crow as Ricardo
 James Olivio as 	Humpy
 John T. Prince as Doc Silver

References

Bibliography
 Connelly, Robert B. The Silents: Silent Feature Films, 1910-36, Volume 40, Issue 2. December Press, 1998.
 Munden, Kenneth White. The American Film Institute Catalog of Motion Pictures Produced in the United States, Part 1. University of California Press, 1997.

External links
 

1925 films
1925 drama films
1920s English-language films
American silent feature films
Silent American drama films
Films directed by James Patrick Hogan
American black-and-white films
Gotham Pictures films
Films set in South America
1920s American films